A plane guard is a warship (commonly a destroyer or frigate) or helicopter tasked to recover the aircrew of planes or helicopters which ditch or crash in the water during aircraft carrier flight operations.

Ships
For ships, the plane guard is positioned at least  behind the carrier and either to port and clear of the carrier, or at a point intersecting the carrier's final approach line. Ships in the latter position provide an additional point of reference to approaching aircraft. One of the ship's boats is prepared for launch and swung over the side, but not placed in the water. If an aircraft ditches or crashes, either while approaching the carrier to land or following a failed landing, the ship proceeds to the approximate position of the aircraft, and the prepared boat is deployed to rescue the aircrew.

The plane guard role is dangerous for ships, as aircraft carriers must often change speed and direction to preserve optimum take-off and landing conditions for their aircraft, and a lack of awareness or any incorrect manoeuvres on the part of either ship can place a plane guard ship under the bows of a carrier travelling at full speed. Both HMAS Voyager (in 1964) and USS Frank E. Evans (in 1969) were lost while incorrectly manoeuvering during plane guard duties which resulted in collisions with the Australian aircraft carrier HMAS Melbourne.

Helicopters

After World War II, plane guard duties and search-and-rescue roles were sometimes carried out by amphibious aircraft. However, prior to the Korean War helicopters were discovered to be more efficient and effective in both roles. As helicopters came into more common usage, they supplemented and sometimes replaced plane guard ships, as they could retrieve crashed aircrew faster and more safely than the ships. However, night operations still required a ship in the plane guard position.

References

External links
  - Lesson 07 (Formations - Microsoft PowerPoint document) contains information on the duties and manoeuvering rules for modern plane guard ships (Slides 64 to 71)

Naval aviation
Naval warfare tactics